National Highway 133A, commonly called NH 133A is a national highway in  India. It is a spur road of National Highway 33. NH-133A traverses the states of Jharkhand and West Bengal in India.

Route 
Barharwa, Pakur, Nimtala

Junctions  

Terminal with National Highway 33 near Barharwa.

Terminal with National Highway 12 near Nimtala.

See also 
 List of National Highways in India by highway number

References

External links 

 NH 133A on OpenStreetMap

National highways in India
National Highways in Jharkhand
National Highways in West Bengal